Kalabantia or Kalabatia (Καλαβατία) was a town of ancient Lycia, which per the Stadiasmus Patarensis was 24 stadia by road from Sidyma.
 
Its site is located near Sancaklı, Asiatic Turkey.

References

Populated places in ancient Lycia
Former populated places in Turkey